Bald Hill is a hill summit northeast of Fort Bragg, in Mendocino County, California.

References

Mountains of Mendocino County, California
Mountains of Northern California